Desimir is a Serbian masculine given name, derived from desiti meaning "to happen", and the common mir meaning "peace". It may refer to:

Desimir Žižović, Yugoslav comics artist, Mirko and Slavko
Desimir Gajić, coach for Sonja Stolić
Desimir Stanojević, Serbian actor, Srećni ljudi

See also
Desimirovac
Desa (monarch)
Desislav
Dejan

Slavic masculine given names
Serbian masculine given names